Mary Ellen "Mel" Harris is an American actress best known for her role as Hope Murdoch Steadman in the ABC drama series Thirtysomething (1987–1991), for which she received a Golden Globe nomination in 1990.

Early life and education
Harris was born in Bethlehem, Pennsylvania, the daughter to Mary Michael "Mike", a high-school science teacher, and Warren Harris, football coach at Bethlehem High School and Princeton University. Harris grew up in North Brunswick, New Jersey and graduated from New Brunswick High School in 1974.

Career
In 1985, shortly before her 1986 acting debut, Harris appeared as a regular contestant on the Dick Clark-hosted syndicated game show The $100,000 Pyramid, credited as Mel Kennedyher third husband's surname. She returned to the game show in 1991, as a celebrity on the John Davidson-hosted show, with a clip of her win in 1985 shown in a flashback.

Television
Harris made her television debut in 1986, with a small role as a character's girlfriend in an episode of Alfred Hitchcock Presents. After appearances in a single episode each of three other series over 1986–1987, Harris had her first starring role, as Hope Murdoch Steadman in the ABC drama series Thirtysomething (1987–1991). The series received critical acclaim during its run, with Harris was nominated for a Golden Globe Award for Best Actress – Television Series Drama in 1990. She directed one episode during the final season.

In 1989, Harris played real-life victim Madge Oberholtzer in the miniseries Cross of Fire. In the 1990s, Harris had many leading roles in made-for-TV movies and miniseries, include The Burden of Proof (1992), Ultimate Betrayal (1994) and The Women of Spring Break (1995). From 1996 to 1998, she starred with Jere Burns in the NBC sitcom Something So Right. The series was cancelled after two seasons.

Harris has appeared in a number of television series in 2000s, including Touched by an Angel, Stargate SG-1, The West Wing, JAG, House, and Criminal Minds. In 2007, she was a regular cast member in the MyNetworkTV limited-run serial Saints & Sinners. At that time, she began working as a writer. She was executive producer and creator of 2012 ABC drama pilot Scruples based on the 1978 novel by Judith Krantz. After a six-year hiatus, Harris returned to television in 2013, appearing in the two episodes of Law & Order: Special Victims Unit.  In 2016, Harris starred in the first season of Hulu drama series Shut Eye, and from 2017 to 2018 had a recurring role in the Bravo comedy series Imposters.

In January 2020, ABC ordered a sequel for Thirtysomething, with Harris set to return alongside original co-stars Ken Olin, Patricia Wettig, and Timothy Busfield. In June 2020, ABC decided not to move forward with the sequel.

Film
Harris made her film debut playing a female leading role in the 1987 action film Wanted: Dead or Alive starring Rutger Hauer. During the time that she was appearing on Thirtysomething, she also starred in the horror film Cameron's Closet (1988) and action comedy K-9 (1989). That same year, Harper's Bazaar named her one of "America's 10 Most Beautiful Women".

She co-starred in the 1992 psychological horror-thriller film Raising Cain, and the following year played the leading role in the thriller film Suture. Other film credits include The Pagemaster (1994), Hangman's Curse (2003), and The Lodger (2009).

Personal life
Harris has been married six times. She was married to David Silbergeld from 1978 to 1979; Brian Kilcommons from 1980 to 1982; photographer David Hume Kennerly from 1983 to 1988 (with whom she had son Byron); actor Cotter Smith from 1988 to 1996 (with whom she had daughter Madeline); and investment banker Michael Toomey from 2001 to 2006.  She has been married to screenwriter and producer Bob Brush since 2009.

Filmography

Film

Television

References

External links

 
 
 
 

Year of birth missing (living people)
Living people
American film actresses
American television actresses
New Brunswick High School alumni
People from Bethlehem, Pennsylvania
People from North Brunswick, New Jersey